State Route 43 (SR 43) is a mainly north–south state highway that runs through the northeastern quadrant of the U.S. state of Ohio. It is one of ten routes to enter Public Square.

Created in the mid-1920s, State Route 43 starts out in Steubenville, and runs northwesterly to Canton via Carrollton. From Canton, the highway runs northerly through Kent and Streetsboro to Aurora, where it then turns northwesterly through Solon, Ohio, and continues passing through suburban Cleveland before entering the city proper, and coming to an end in downtown at Public Square. The five routes share a common endpoint in the middle of Public Square, where they intersect the triplex of U.S. Route 6, U.S. Route 42 and State Route 3.

Route description
State Route 43 runs through the counties of Jefferson, Carroll, Stark, Portage, Geauga and Cuyahoga.  

The portion of State Route 43 beginning with its concurrent section with U.S. Route 30 in Canton, north through Kent and to Aurora, then northwest to the State Route 91 junction in Solon is included within the National Highway System, a system of highways deemed most important for the country's economy, defense and mobility.

Jefferson County
Beginning in Jefferson County at its southern terminus at a signalized intersection with State Route 7 in Steubenville along the Ohio River and the Ohio-West Virginia border across from Weirton, West Virginia, State Route 43 follows Washington Street northwesterly before becoming a short divided highway just west of downtown.  State Route 43 then becomes Sunset Boulevard, and heads westerly into Wintersville, where it is known as Main Street.  The state highway then departs the town to the northwest along Canton Road, leading up to a diamond interchange with the U.S. Route 22 freeway.  State Route 43 next runs northwesterly into the village of Richmond, where it is briefly co-signed with State Route 152.  State Route 43 then trends westerly into the unincorporated community of East Springfield, before turning northerly and passing through the small village of Amsterdam, where it is briefly joined by State Route 164.  State Route 43 departs Jefferson County as it exits the village to the northwest, and enters into Carroll County.

Carroll County
State Route 43 is almost entirely rural in Carroll County, where it runs northwesterly into Harlem Springs along Steubenville Road, then turns westerly to its junction with State Route 9.  The two highways then converge, and run northwesterly into Carrollton.  State Route 9 and State Route 43 meet State Route 39 on the eastern outskirts of town, and the three highways run together northwesterly along East Main Street into downtown Carrollton and the triplex's junction with State Route 332, where State Route 9 departs to the north via North Lisbon Street.  State Route 39 and State Route 43 then continue together along West Main Street to the Canton Road intersection, where State Route 43 splits from State Route 39, and follows Canton Road northerly out of Carrollton.  The state route turns northwesterly, and comes to its eastern intersection with State Route 183 just east of Malvern.  The two state routes run westerly through Malvern along Canal Street, then onto Alliance Road after departing the village, and ultimately to the point where they cross into Stark County.

Stark County
Into Stark County, State Route 43 jointly heads westerly with State Route 183 to the T-intersection that marks their western split just north of Waynesburg.  Turning north, State Route 43 soon meets State Route 44 at its southern terminus.  Turning northwesterly into rural Sandy Township, State Route 43 makes its way up into Canton.  In Canton, running just to the east of, but never intersecting Interstate 77, State Route 43 has junctions with U.S. Route 30, State Route 172, State Route 153 and U.S. Route 62.  State Route 43 then enters Plain Township, and passes northerly through a portion of Lake Township prior to entering Hartville, where it meets State Route 619.  After duplexing with State Route 619 for a short distance westerly, State Route 43 turns northerly again, and enters into Portage County.

Portage County

State Route 43 heads north through Suffield Township, where it meets U.S. Route 224.  Further north, after crossing the Mogadore Reservoir, State Route 43 meets Interstate 76 at Exit 33 just south of Kent in Brimfield.  Continuing north, the state highway enters Kent along South Water Street, and passes just to the west of the campus of Kent State University.  Downtown, State Route 43 turns west onto Haymaker Parkway and is briefly co-signed with State Route 59 as it crosses the Cuyahoga River.  Turning north again, State Route 43 is split into two one-way roads, with southbound traffic on North and South Mantua Streets, and northbound traffic using Gougler Avenue and River Street.  When the two directions of traffic converge into North Mantua Street, State Route 43 becomes a four- to five-lane roadway.  It runs north into Streetsboro where it meets cosigned State Route 14 and State Route 303.  After crossing underneath the Ohio Turnpike, State Route 43 continues north into Aurora and is known as Chillicothe Road.  Splitting from Chillicothe Road at the intersection marking the southern terminus of State Route 306 in downtown Aurora, State Route 43 turns to the northwest onto Aurora Road, and crosses State Route 82.  After passing Geauga Lake and the adjacent waterpark Wildwater Kingdom, State Route 43 enters Geauga County.

Geauga County
State Route 43 clips the southwestern corner of the county in Bainbridge Township. The posted direction changes from north–south to the southeast to east–west to the northwest in this small section, as of 2008. State Route 43 leaves Geauga County and then enters Cuyahoga County.

Cuyahoga County
Entering into Cuyahoga County at Solon northwesterly along Aurora Road, State Route 43 meets State Route 91 (S.O.M. Center Road) in the downtown of the city.  Into Bedford Heights, State Route 43 passes under the triangular interchange between Interstate 271, Interstate 480 and U.S. Route 422.  On the other side of the triangle, the state highway passes through North Randall, where it briefly follows State Route 8 north before turning northwest onto Miles Road.  After going through Warrensville Heights, State Route 43 enters Cleveland.  At the Broadway Avenue intersection, State Route 43 meets State Route 14, and the two highways converge.  From this point into downtown Cleveland, State Route 43 is no longer signed, although it has been in the past.  The combined state routes run northwesterly through the Slavic Village neighborhood, cross through partial interchanges with Interstate 77 and Interstate 490, and converge with U.S. Route 422, State Route 8 and State Route 87 onto Ontario Avenue.  After intersecting Interstate 90, State Route 43 comes to an end along with the other four routes it is combined with at Public Square in downtown Cleveland, where the highways meet U.S. Route 6, U.S. Route 20, U.S. Route 42 and U.S. Route 322.

History
State Route 43 is one of the original state highways, though the initial designation as State Route 43 was only applied on the segment between Steubenville and Canton.  Until 1926, the section of modern State Route 43 from Canton to Aurora was signed as State Route 89 while the section from Aurora to its northern junction with State Route 14 was designated as State Route 82.  In 1930, State Route 43 was rerouted along a previously unnumbered road which put it approximately one mile west of North Olmsted.  This section of road would be renumbered as State Route 17 in 1934.  The section from North Randall to downtown Cleveland was part of State Route 8 from 1931–1938.  By 1939, State Route 43 was extended to downtown Cleveland, cosigned with State Route 14.  In 1975, State Route 43 was rerouted in Kent along the recently completed Haymaker Parkway.  Previously it had followed South Water Street to Kent's center and then turned west over the Cuyahoga River along the Main Street bridge.

Major intersections

References

External links

 ODOT Official Transportation Maps 1912–2003

Canton, Ohio
Transportation in Carroll County, Ohio
Transportation in Cuyahoga County, Ohio
Transportation in Geauga County, Ohio
Transportation in Jefferson County, Ohio
Kent, Ohio
Transportation in Portage County, Ohio
Transportation in Stark County, Ohio
043
Steubenville, Ohio
Transportation in Cleveland